Cowdry bodies are eosinophilic or basophilic nuclear inclusions composed of nucleic acid and protein seen in cells infected with Herpes simplex virus, Varicella-zoster virus, and Cytomegalovirus. They are named after Edmund Cowdry.

There are two types of intranuclear Cowdry bodies: 
 Type A (as seen in herpes simplex, VZV and measles ) 
 Type B (as seen in infection with poliovirus, CMV and adenovirus), though it may seem that this is an antiquated and perhaps illusory type.

Light microscopy is used for detection of Cowdry bodies.

References

Histopathology